A ringtone or ring tone is the sound made by a telephone to indicate an incoming call or text message.

Ringtone may also refer to:

 Ringtone (film), a 2010 Malayalam film 
 "Ringtone" (song), a song from the Internet Leaks EP from "Weird Al" Yankovic
 "The Ringtone", an episode of the television show Spooky Nights
 "Ringtone" by 100 Gecs from their album "1000 Gecs"
 "Ringtone" (remix), a remix of the song, featuring Charli XCX, Rico Nasty and Kero Kero Bonito